Wind Jet S.p.A. was an Italian low-cost airline based in Catania, Italy. It was founded in 2003, following the disbandment of Air Sicilia by current CEO Antonino Pulvirenti, also owner of football team Calcio Catania. On 11 August 2012 the airline ceased operations until further notice due to financial troubles. At that time it was the third-largest Italian airline by passenger numbers, and operated national and European flights primarily from its hub in Catania.

History 
Windjet was established in 2003 and started operations on 17 June 2003. It was 100% owned by the Finaria Group.

On 25 January 2012, Alitalia declared they would start a merger with Wind Jet, as well as with Blue Panorama, another Italian airline.
On 12 April 2012, Alitalia chose to pursue the sole acquisition of Wind Jet with a cash payment of between 20 and 30 million €, while abandoning the project of a merger with Blue Panorama Airlines.

By the end of July 2012, the Italian antitrust authority granted Alitalia leave to acquire Wind Jet, but in return Alitalia would have to give up slots on key domestic routes. Faced with this, Alitalia cancelled the plans a few days later in August 2012. As a result, the cash-strapped airline suspended all flights on 11 August 2012, faced with losing their air operator's certificate, leaving 300,000 passengers stranded. The Italian authorities tried to prompt Alitalia to acquire Wind Jet, but they did not succeed.

The charter airline Livingston announced that it would take over several flights of Wind Jet, but it was unclear if they would continue to operate the routes in the future.

Destinations

Wind Jet had a codeshare agreement with Meridiana fly on domestic routes out of Catania and Palermo airports.

Fleet

The Wind Jet fleet consisted of the following aircraft (as of 23 May 2012):

Incidents and accidents 

 On 24 September 2010, Wind Jet Flight 243, operated by an Airbus A319-132, registration EI-EDM (ex. N501NK), landed short of the runway at Punta Raisi Airport, Palermo, Italy after encountering a thunderstorm and windshear on approach. The aircraft was substantially damaged when it impacted the localiser—both main undercarriage sets collapsed and the aircraft was evacuated by the emergency slides. Around twenty passengers were injured, mostly sustaining minor cuts and bruises, whiplash, and shock. One passenger was reported to have dislocated his shoulder.  The Agenzia Nazionale per la Sicurezza del Volo opened an investigation into the accident. Wind Jet stated that they believed windshear was the cause of the incident. The trial opening in 2013 took its bases on the accusation that it was not caused by windshear but by errors of the two pilots. Both of them asked to be processed via short-trial procedure.

References

External links

Official website 
Official website (archive)
Official website  (archive)
ch-aviation Windjet Fleet

Italian companies established in 2003
Italian companies disestablished in 2012
Defunct airlines of Italy
Defunct European low-cost airlines
Airlines established in 2003
Airlines disestablished in 2012
Sicily